The Pauline Laws are the house laws of the Romanov rulers of the Russian Empire. The name comes from the fact that they were initially established by Emperor Paul I of Russia in 1797.

Paul I abolished Peter the Great's law that allowed each reigning emperor or empress to designate his or her successor and substituted a strict order of succession by proclaiming that the eldest son of the monarch would inherit the throne, followed by other dynasts according to primogeniture in the male line. Paul thus implemented a semi-Salic line of succession to the Russian throne, which would pass to a female and through the female (cognatic) line of the dynasty only upon the extinction of all legitimately-born male dynasts.

Over time, the house laws were amended, and in the late Russian Empire, the laws governing membership in the imperial house, succession to the throne and other dynastic subjects were divided, with some being included in the Fundamental Laws of the Russian Empire and others in the Statute of the Imperial Family (codification of 1906, as amended to 1911).

Dynastic marriage
In the spring of 1911, Princess Tatiana Konstantinovna of Russia became engaged to Prince Konstantin Alexandrovich Bagration (1889–1915), a Georgian by birth who served in a Russian Imperial Guard regiment and would die in World War I. She was to be the first daughter of the Romanovs who openly married a Russian subject or non-dynastic prince since the dynasty had ascended the throne in 1613. Her anxious father approached the Emperor Nicholas II and his empress, Alexandra Fyodorovna of Hesse, for approval.

On 30 November 1910, Grand Duke Constantine Konstantinovich noted in one of his posthumously-published journals (From the Diaries of Grand Duke Konstantin Konstantinovich, Moscow, February 1994) that he had received assurances that "they would never look upon her marriage to a Bagration as morganatic, because this House, like the House of Orléans, is descended from a once ruling dynasty."

Previously, the morganatic wives of Romanov grand dukes had been banished from Russia, along with their disgraced husbands such as Sophia von Merenberg, Countess de Torby and Grand Duke Michael Mikhailovich, as well as Princess Olga Paley and Grand Duke Paul Aleksandrovich). Female Romanovs had dared to marry morganatically only in secret, and the couples' relationships remained open secrets, such as Empress Elizabeth of Russia and Alexey Razumovsky, as well as the second marriage of Grand Duchess Maria Nikolayevna and Count Grigory Stroganov).

Nonetheless, Tatiana Konstantinovna's marriage was legally morganatic. It was in fact the first marriage in the dynasty conducted in compliance with the Emperor's formal decision not to accept as dynastic the marriages of even the most junior Romanovs, those who bore only the title of prince or princess, with non-royal partners. According to Always a Grand Duke, the 1933 memoir of Nicholas II's brother-in-law, Grand Duke Alexander Mikhailovich (published in New York, by Farrar and Rinehart, Inc.), concern about the eventual marriages of cadet Romanovs so troubled the senior grand dukes that Alexander approached the Emperor about relaxing the requirement that all dynasts marry partners "possessing corresponding rank" enshrined in Article 188 of the Pauline Laws, but he was rebuffed. The grand dukes then officially petitioned the Emperor by a commission chaired by Grand Duke Nicholas Nikolayevich of Russia, requesting that a new category of dynastic marriages be recognised, to consist of Imperial princes and princesses entitled, with specific Imperial consent, to marry persons of non-royal blood but retaining the right to transmit to the issue of eligibility to inherit the throne. The Emperor's response was issued formally on 14 June 1911 in the form of a memorandum from the Minister of the Imperial Court, Baron Vladimir Frederiks:

The Lord Emperor has seen fit to permit marriages to persons not possessing corresponding rank of not all Members of the Imperial Family, but only of Princes and Princesses of the Blood Imperial ... Princes as well as Princesses of the Blood Imperial, upon contracting a marriage with a person not possessing corresponding rank, shall personally retain the title and privileges which are theirs by birth, with the exception of their right to succession from which they shall have abdicated before entering the marriage. In relation to the categorization of the marriages of Princes and Princesses of the Blood Imperial, the Lord Emperor has seen fit to recognize only two categories in these marriages: (a) equal marriages, i.e. those contracted with persons belonging to a Royal or Ruling House, and (b) unequal marriages, i.e. those contracted with persons not belonging to a Royal or Ruling House, and will not recognize any other categories.

As promised in that communiqué (the so-called "Frederiks Memorandum"), the Emperor proceeded to legalise authorised marriages of imperial Romanovs below grand ducal rank to those who lacked "corresponding rank". Such marriages had been altogether banned, rather than deemed morganatic, by Alexander III's ukase #5868 on  23 March 1889. However, ukase #35731/1489, issued on 11 August 1911, amended the 1889 ban with these words: "Henceforth no grand duke or grand duchess may contract a marriage with a person not possessing corresponding rank, that is, not belonging to a Royal or Ruling house".

Both the 1889 and 1911 decrees were addenda to Article 188 of the Pauline laws (recodified as article 63 of the Imperial Family Statute). Left intact, however, was that original statute: "A person of the Imperial family who has entered into a marriage alliance with a person not possessing corresponding rank, that is, not belonging to a Royal or Ruling House, cannot pass on to that person, or to any posterity that may issue from such a marriage, the rights which belong to the Members of the Imperial family".

Also remaining unrepealed was Article 36 ("Children born of a marriage between a member of the Imperial Family and a person not of corresponding rank, that is, not belonging to a Royal or Ruling House, shall have no right of succession to the Throne"). Aside from Article 188, Article 36 applied to prevent Tatiana Konstantinovna's issue from claiming succession rights.

Her contemplated marriage having been rendered legal, Tatiana Konstantinovna renounced her dynastic rights, as was required. Nicholas II acknowledged that in a ukase addressed to the Imperial Senate on 9 February 1914: "Her Highness the Princess Tatiana Konstantinovna has presented to Us over Her own sign manual, a renunciation of the right to succession to the Imperial Throne of All the Russias belonging to Her as a member of the Imperial House". She received in return Nicholas II’s authorisation to marry Bagration-Mukhransky. That was the same family into which Princess Leonida Bagration of Mukhrani, the wife of Vladimir Cyrillovich, was born.

Tatiana Konstantinovna and her Georgian prince were married at her father's estate at Pavlovsk, on 3 September 1911. The Emperor was present at the wedding and on the same day issued yet another ukase (#35766): "By Our and Grand Duke Konstantin Konstantinovich's and Grand Duchess Elizaveta Mavrikievna’s consent, the wedding took place on 24th day of this August [old style] of the Daughter of Their Imperial Highnesses, Her Highness the Princess Tatiana Konstantinovna, with Prince Konstantin Bagration-Mukhransky. In consequence of this order: The Princess Tatiana Konstantiovna to retain the title of Highness and henceforth to bear the name of Her Highness the Princess Tatiana Konstantinovna Princess Bagration-Mukhransky...".

References

1797 in law
1797 establishments in the Russian Empire
Kinship and descent
Law in the Russian Empire
Russian monarchy
Succession acts
Paul I of Russia